Sorbiers is a commune in the Loire department in central France.

Population

Twin towns — sister cities
Sorbiers is twinned with:

  Senj, Croatia
  Novi Ligure, Italy

See also
Communes of the Loire department

References

Communes of Loire (department)
Loire communes articles needing translation from French Wikipedia